George Frederick Keller (1846–?) was a cartoonist active in California, known as the primary illustrator of the San Francisco satirical magazine The Wasp. Born in Prussia, he emigrated to the United States and fought in the U.S. Civil War, settling in California around 1870. He apprenticed to lithographer George Baker, where his first job was lithographing colorful cigar box labels. He joined The Wasp, also founded by Prussian immigrants, with its first issue, debuting in August 1876. Some of his work reflected the anti-Chinese and anti-immigrant sentiment of late 19th-Century San Francisco in highly racialized stereotypes, depicting Chinese as rat-like invaders, Irish as Neanderthals, and Jews as hook-nosed moneylenders. Keller's final cartoon was published June 30, 1883, after which he left the San Francisco area "and was never heard from again".

References

External links

1846 births
Year of death missing
Artists from San Francisco
American editorial cartoonists
Prussian emigrants to the United States
19th-century American artists